Parnassius kiritshenkoi is a high-altitude butterfly which is found only in the eastern Pamir Mountains.
It is a member of the snow Apollo genus Parnassius of the swallowtail family, Papilionidae. The species was first described by Andrey Avinoff in 1910.

For many years, P. kiritshenkoi was regarded as a subspecies of Parnassius staudingeri. It is however sympatric with P. staudingeri mustagata of the Sarykolsky Mountains and with P. staudingeri illustris of the Zaalaisky Mountains.

References
 Weiss, J. C. (1999). The Parnassiinae of the World. Part 3. Hillside Books, Canterbury, U.K.

External links
"Parnassius kiritshenkoi Avinov, 1910". Russian-Insects.com. Text and photos.
Parnassius of the World Text and photos. Archived October 23, 2007.
"Kailasius kiritshenkoi Avinoff, 1910". Insecta.pro. Image.

kiritshenkoi
Butterflies described in 1910